Bangladesh participated in the 2006 Asian Games held in Doha, Qatar, with a total of 73 athletes (64 men, 7 women) in twelve different sports. Bangladesh won a bronze medal in Kabaddi and was ranked 36th in a three-way tie with Afghanistan and Yemen in the medal standings.

Medalists

See also
 Bangladesh at the Asian Games
 Bangladesh at the Olympics

References

Nations at the 2006 Asian Games
2006
Asian Games